Magid M. Abraham (born April 13, 1958) is an entrepreneur and expert on market research, consumer modeling, and information systems. He has held several executive positions, two of which were within companies he founded.

Abraham authored articles in academic and industry journals, including the Harvard Business Review, Journal of Marketing Research, and Marketing Science. He is a speaker at marketing industry conferences.

Early life
Abraham was born in Mashghara, a small town in Lebanon, where he was raised on his father’s fruit farm. His interests in school included math, science, and especially physics, and this fascination has remained with him throughout his life. He attended Lebanon’s high school, followed by Paris’ engineering university, École Polytechnique. He went to the United States to attend the MIT Sloan School of Management, where he graduated with an MBA in 1981 and later a PhD in operations research.

Career
Abraham joined Information Resources, Inc. (IRI) in 1985.
He served as IRI president and chief operating officer from 1993 to 1994, and vice chairman of the board of directors from 1994 until 1995. At IRI, Abraham designed marketing applications that eventually became standards of CPG marketing practice, as referenced in his articles 'Promoter: An Automated Promotion Evaluation System', 1987, Marketing Science and 'An Implemented System for Improving Promotion Productivity Using Store Scanner Data', 1993, Marketing Science.

Abraham was founder and CEO of Paragren Technologies in 1995, which became part of Siebel Systems.

In 1999, Abraham co-founded comScore, an Internet market intelligence company where he served as CEO for 14 years and took public in 2007. comScore was selected as a “Technology Pioneer” by the World Economic Forum before the forum’s annual conference in Davos in 2007. In 2016, Abraham stepped down as executive chairman and resigned from comScore's board of directors and became the executive chairman of APX Labs (later renamed Upskill). Linda Abraham became vice chair. During the same year, Abraham became a visiting scholar at Stanford and taught for three years at the Graduate School of Business.

In January 2008, Abraham joined the board of directors of Milo.com, a company founded by his son Jack Abraham which was acquired by eBay in 2010 for $75M.

Abraham co-founded NeuraWell, a mental health therapeutics company, where he currently serves as CEO.

Awards and recognition

In 1996, Abraham was awarded the Paul Green Award by the AMA for an article that he co-authored in the Journal of Marketing Research in 1995 described as showing “the most potential to contribute to the practice of marketing research and research in marketing." That award was validated 5 years after the initial publication, with the AMA William F. O'Dell Award in 2000 recognizing research which made a significant, long-term contribution to the marketing discipline.

2016 : Advertising Research Foundation's Great Mind Awards: Lifetime Achievement Award.
2011 : MIT Sloan's Buck Weaver Award, for theory and practice in marketing science
''2009 : American Marketing Association, Charles Coolidge Parlin Marketing Research Award2008 : Ernst and Young, Entrepreneur Hall of Fame2008 : World Economic Forum, “Technology Pioneer”2000 : American Marketing Association, William F. O’Dell Award1992'' : "Top 40 Under 40" awarded by Crain’s Chicago Business, given to 40 business professionals in Chicago annually.

Personal life  

In April of 2022, Abraham and his wife purchased a 5,968 square feet condo at Jeffery Soffer's Turnberry Ocean Club in Iseles beach for a reported $14.3 million.

References

External links
Forbes interview with Dr. Abraham CEO Spotlight
CNN Money 'The online numbers game' featuring Dr. Abraham
Magid Abraham - Video clip of Davos Debates in China 2009. 11 September 2009.
Photograph: Dr. Abraham at the World Economic Forum on Latin America 2009. Rio de Janeiro. Flickr.com 14 April 2009.
Photograph: Dr. Abraham at the DLD Conference 2010. Munich. Life.com. 25 January 2010.

1958 births
American businesspeople
MIT Sloan School of Management alumni
Living people
American people of Lebanese descent